The  are a group of volcanic islands stretching south and east from the Izu Peninsula of Honshū, Japan. Administratively, they form two towns and six villages; all part of Tokyo Prefecture. The largest is Izu Ōshima, usually called simply Ōshima.

Although usually called the "Seven Islands of Izu" (伊豆七島 in Japanese), there are in fact more than a dozen islands and islets. Nine among them are currently inhabited.

Geography

The largest of them is Izu Oshima (8,346 inhabitants), the smallest Toshima (292 inhabitants, .) Of the inhabited islands, seven are traditionally referred to as the "Izu Seven": Oshima, Toshima, Niijima, Kozujima, Miyakejima, Hachijojima, and Mikurajima, though Shikinejima and Aogashima are sometimes included as well.

Each of the islands has its unique character: Oshima is noted for its active volcano Mt Mihara and camellias, Hachijojima for its former penal colony, Mikurajima for dolphin watching, Niijima for its numerous beaches, Kozujima for its white sandy shores, Hachijojima for its well-preserved unique culture, and Miyakejima for the 2001 volcanic eruption.

During the Edo period, Nii-jima, Miyake-jima, and Hachijō-jima served as places of exile for criminals.

The subtropical Ogasawara Islands, which are also administratively part of Tokyo, lie further to the south. They form a far-flung archipelago of over thirty (30) islands some  due south of Tokyo.

Islands

Administrative divisions
The Izu Islands are divided into two towns (Oshima and Hachijojima) and six villages (remaining inhabited islands.)  Three subprefectures are formed above the municipalities as branch offices of the metropolitan government.

All the islands (more than a dozen in total) lie within the Fuji-Hakone-Izu National Park. The four southernmost islands are not administrated under any town or village in Hachijō Subprefecture, but are unincorporated areas.  Torishima is now uninhabited but is an important bird refuge.

Deserted islands between Aogashima and Ogasawara Islands, namely Bayonaise Rocks (Beyonēzu Retsugan), Smith Island (Sumisu-tō), Torishima, and Lot's Wife (Sōfu-iwa) do not belong to any municipality, because both Hachijō Town and Aogashima Village claim administrative rights. They are directly controlled by Hachijō Subprefecture instead.

Ōshima Subprefecture
 Ōshima Town: Izu Ōshima
 Toshima Village: Toshima
 Niijima Village: Niijima, Shikinejima, and Udoneshima
 Kōzushima Village: Kōzushima
Miyake Subprefecture
 Miyake Village: Miyakejima and Ōnoharajima
 Mikurajima Village: Mikurajima, Inambajima
Hachijō Subprefecture
 Hachijō Town: Hachijōjima and Hachijōkojima
 Aogashima Village: Aogashima
unincorporated: Bayonnaise Rocks (Beyonēzu Retsugan), Sumisu-tō, Torishima, and Sōfu-iwa

Demographics
Though the population on the Izu Islands has been dropping, the phase is less dramatic than on other isolated Japanese islands.

The divergent Hachijō language is spoken on the islands.

Infrastructure

The primary industries are fisheries, agriculture, and tourism.  The most scenic spots on the islands are crowded with tourists during summers. Popular tourist activities include swimming, scuba diving, surfing, fishing, bird watching and trekking.

Transportation between the islands, by cargo-passengers boats, jetfoils, and aircraft, is supported by harbours on all inhabited islands and five airports (small islands can be reached by helicopter).

There are 5 airports, 15 harbors, and 19 fishing ports. Flights from Tokyo take 30 minutes, while boats take 7–10 hours and jetfoils make the route in about two hours.

There was no electricity on the islands before 1953, but by 1962 98% of the area was receiving electricity.

Geology
The islands occupy the northern portion of the Izu–Bonin–Mariana Arc which extends to the Izu Peninsula and Mount Fuji on the Honshū mainland which are northern extensions of the Izu volcanic arc.  The Izu arc ends there at a tectonic triple junction.

Volcanic activity is frequent in the area.  31 people were killed when the research vessel Kaiyō Maru no 5 was destroyed during the 1953 eruption of Myōjin-shō. Volcanic activity, including the release of harmful gases, forced the evacuation of Miyake-jima in 2000. Residents were allowed to return permanently to the island in February 2005 but were required to carry gas masks in case of future volcanic emissions.

To handle the various types of natural disasters threatening the region, including tsunamis, storm, floods, and volcanism, Tokyo metropolitan government has developed prevention and safety measures, including hazard maps and evacuation guidance, radios, signs, and a transport system for emergency supplies.

Ecology
A chain of volcanic islands, the Izu Archipelago are oceanic islands that formed relatively recently (within a few million years) without any previous connection to mainland Japan.  In contrast to isolated Pacific islands, such as Hawaii and the Galápagos, the Izu Islands are located near the mainland and have thus been frequently colonized by various species by overseas dispersal from the mainland or from adjacent islands.  This make them interesting for the studies of ecological and evolutionary processes.

Campanula (Bellflower) colonized the entire archipelago in a single event.  Similarly, the Euhadra snails, endemic to Japan, populated the islands in a single event and all individuals on inhabited islands possess an identical haplotype.  The Apodemus mice, on the other hand, colonized the islands from the mainland in two independent events.

History
 680 - Izu Province was established in the form of being separated from Suruga Province. At that time, the Izu islands belonged to Kamo-gun.
 1643 - Explorer Maarten Gerritsz Vries called it the De Vries Archipelago
 November 14, 1871 (December 25, 1871) --- Due to the first prefectural integration, it became under the jurisdiction of Ashigara Prefecture.
 1876 (Meiji 9), April 18 - Due to the second prefectural integration, it became under the jurisdiction of Shizuoka Prefecture.
 1878 (Meiji 11), January 11 - will be under the jurisdiction of Tokyo Prefecture

See also

 List of islands of Japan

References

 Teikoku's Complete Atlas of Japan, Teikoku-Shoin Co., Ltd. Tokyo 1990, 
 The official tokyo island information page

 

Tourist attractions in Tokyo
Archipelagoes of Japan
Islands of Tokyo
Archipelagoes of the Pacific Ocean